Frank De La Paz Perdomo (born 24 May 1975) is a Cuban chess player. He was awarded the title of Grandmaster (GM) by FIDE in 2004.

In 1998, he represented Cuba as 2nd reserve in the 33rd Chess Olympiad, scoring 1.5 out of 4.

He played in the Chess World Cup 2011, where he was defeated by Teimour Radjabov in the first round.

References

External links 
 
 Frank De La Paz Perdomo chess games at 365Chess.com
 

1975 births
Living people
Chess grandmasters
Cuban chess players